Saad Haddad (1936 – 14 January 1984) was the founder and head of the South Lebanon Army (SLA) during the Lebanese Civil War. For years Haddad was closely collaborating and receiving arms and political support from Israel against Lebanese government forces, Hezbollah, and the Syrian Army. Haddad died of cancer in his house in Marjayoun.

Lebanese Civil War
Since the 1970s there has been a cyclical pattern of guerrilla attacks carried out by Palestinian militiamen on Israel and by the IDF on Palestinian targets. In the aftermath of the 1975 Civil War, Lebanese-generated security concerns grew for Israel. At the same time, the breakdown of Lebanon's central government provided opportunities for Israel to act. Around 1975, Israel sponsored the creation of a surrogate force, Lebanese Christian (Melkite) Major Saad Haddad was the first officer to defect from the Lebanese Army to ally himself with Israel, a defection which led to the formation of the pro-Israel Free Lebanon Army, based in a corridor, the "Security Zone" along Lebanon's southern border from 1982 after Israel's invasion of Lebanon. This force, which called itself the Free Lebanon Army (but was later renamed the South Lebanon Army (SLA) under leader Antoine Lahad in May 1980), was intended to prevent infiltration into Israel of Palestinian guerrillas. In 1978, Israel invaded Lebanon, clearing out Palestine Liberation Organization (PLO) strongholds as far north as the Litani River.

On 18 April 1979, Haddad proclaimed the area controlled by his force Independent Free Lebanon. The following day, he was branded a traitor to the Lebanese government and officially dismissed from the Lebanese Army. 

Another consequence of the Israeli invasion was the establishment in southern Lebanon of the United Nations Interim Force in Lebanon, whose mission was to separate the various combatants. Haddad's militia collaborated with Israel and received the bulk of its arms, equipment, supplies and ordnance from Israel. There are eyewitness accounts that support the claim that Saad Haddad's troops were involved in the massacres of Sabra and Shatila in 1982. In the massacre an estimated 763 - 3,500 civilians were killed. In 1984, Haddad died of cancer. His successor as the head of the SLA was general Antoine Lahad.

With the Israeli retreat the SLA quickly collapsed. On 24 May 2000, the sight of Saad Haddad's statue being dragged through the streets of the Lebanese town of Marjayoun was a sure sign that the South Lebanon Army was gone.

During the South Lebanon conflict (1982–2000), Saad Haddad headed the Christian radio station "Voice of Hope", initially set up and funded by George Otis of High Adventure Ministries. The Voice of Hope was set up as a charitable endeavor to help the Christian enclave in Southern Lebanon, but it quickly became politicized when Haddad used it for political diatribes aimed at his many enemies. High Adventure billed it as the only privately owned radio station in the Middle East that was broadcasting the Gospel, but its message was often tainted by the necessary affiliation with Haddad's militia, as its operation depended upon his protection and authority, resulting in a very curious blend of scripture lessons and political commentary which the staff at the station could not control or regulate.

Descendants and legacy
On 7 June 2012, Lebanese daily newspaper As Safir reported on the progress of Saad Haddad's daughter Arza (meaning "Cedar Tree" in Arabic) as a researcher in ballistics and rocket science at the Technion University in Haifa. She obtained master's degree in aeronautics in June 2012.

External links
SLA.Miniature

References

1936 births
1984 deaths
Lebanese rebels
Lebanese Melkite Greek Catholics
Lebanese military personnel
Deaths from cancer in Lebanon
People of the Lebanese Civil War
People from Marjeyoun District